The 752nd Guards Petrokovskaya twice Red Banner, Orders of Suvorov, Kutuzov and Bogdan Khmelnitsky Motor Rifle Regiment is a mechanized infantry regiment of the Russian Ground Forces.

Its first forebears were the 6th Guards Mechanised Regiment, later 17th Guards Mechanised Brigade, of the 6th Guards Mechanised Corps, created in 1943. 

In mid-1945, in accordance with an order of the State Committee of Defence (NKO), the 17th Guards Mechanised Brigade became the 17th Guards Mechanised Regiment (V/Ch 49941) of the 6th Guards Mechanised Division (V/Ch 89428). From June 1946 it was located in Eberswalde in East Germany, part of the Group of Soviet Forces Germany. As part of the creation of motor rifle divisions in 1957, the regiment became the 81st Guards Motor Rifle Regiment, and with a reorganisation in 1985, became part of the 90th Guards Tank Division. 

In 1993, as part of the withdrawal of former Soviet forces from Germany, along with other units of the 90th Guards Tank Division, the regiment was withdrawn to the village of Roshchinsky, Samara Oblast, Russian Federation, becoming part of the 2nd Guards Tank Army of the Volga Military District.

In accordance with the order of the Minister of Defense of the Russian Federation No. 036 dated June 15, 1994, the 81st Guards MRR stationed on the territory of the Volga Cossack Horde was given the traditional Cossack name "Volga Cossack." 

In 1994-1995, as part of the "Northern" operational group, the regiment took part in the assault on Grozny during the First Chechen War. On December 31, 1994, together with units of the 131st Motor Rifle Brigade, the regiment was surrounded. Withdrawing from the encirclement, the regiment suffered very significant losses. On or about 9 April 1995, the regiment was withdrawn from Chechnya.

In December 1997, the 90th Guards Tank Division was reduced to the status of a Base for Storage of Weapons and Equipment. As a result, the regiment was transferred to the 27th Guards Motor Rifle Division of the Volga Military District, and moved to the village of Kryazh (a suburb of Samara), becoming a regiment of constant readiness.

In the period from February to June 2009, on the basis of the 81st Guards Motor Rifle Regiment, was created, with the transfer of the Guards Battle Banner, awards, honorary titles and the historical form of the regiment, the 23rd guards motor rifle Petrokovskaya twice Red Banner, the orders of Suvorov, Kutuzov and Bogdan Khmelnitsky Volga Cossack brigade.

In 2016, the 23rd Separate Guards Motor Rifle Brigade was moved from Samara to the city of Valuiki, Belgorod Oblast, and reorganized into the 752nd Guards Motor Rifle Regiment (Military Unit Number 34670) with the preservation of awards, ranks and historical traditions. There it joined the 3rd Motor Rifle Division.

During the 2022 Russian invasion of Ukraine, the 752nd Motorized Rifle Regiment of the 20th Combined Arms Army was reported as encircled at the end of September in Drobysheve and Lyman.

References 

Ground Forces regiments of the Russian Federation
Infantry regiments
Infantry units and formations of Russia
Military units and formations established in 2016